Valery Alekseyevich Muratov (born 1 May 1946 in Kolomna) is a former ice speed skater from the USSR, who represented his native country in three consecutive Winter Olympics, starting in 1968 in Grenoble, France. He trained in Kolomna at Burevestnik and later at the Armed Forces sports society.

In 1972 Muratov was awarded the Medal For Labour Heroism.

World records 

Source: SpeedSkatingStats.com

References

External links
 
 
 
 
 Valery Muratov at SpeedSkatingStats.com
 Biography and photos 

1946 births
Living people
Russian male speed skaters
Soviet male speed skaters
Olympic speed skaters of the Soviet Union
Olympic silver medalists for the Soviet Union
Olympic bronze medalists for the Soviet Union
Olympic medalists in speed skating
Speed skaters at the 1968 Winter Olympics
Speed skaters at the 1972 Winter Olympics
Speed skaters at the 1976 Winter Olympics
Medalists at the 1972 Winter Olympics
Medalists at the 1976 Winter Olympics
Speed skaters from Moscow
Burevestnik (sports society) athletes
Armed Forces sports society athletes
World record setters in speed skating
World Sprint Speed Skating Championships medalists
Universiade silver medalists for the Soviet Union
Universiade medalists in speed skating
Competitors at the 1970 Winter Universiade